An optically violent variable quasar (often abbreviated as OVV quasar) is a type of highly variable quasar.  It is a subtype of blazar that consists of a few rare, bright radio galaxies, whose visible light output can change by 50% in a day. OVV quasars have essentially become unified with highly polarized quasars (HPQ), core-dominated quasars (CDQ), and flat-spectrum radio quasars (FSRQ). Different terms are used but the term FSRQ is gaining popularity effectively making the other terms archaic.

At visible wavelengths, they are similar in appearance to BL Lac objects but generally have stronger broad emission lines.

Examples
3C 279
S5 0014+81

References

 

Active galaxy types